José Augusto César León Asensio (born 21 February 1934 in Santiago, Dominican Republic) is a Dominican businessman. León is the President of Grupo León Jimenes. According to Forbes, León Asensio is among the ten largest fortunes in the Dominican Republic, with a net worth that borders the billion-dollar mark.

Early life 
Born in 1934 as the seventh and last child of Eduardo Antonio León Jimenes (Guazumal, Tamboril, Santiago, 1885-1937) and María Asensio Córdoba (1896–1976). His father died when he was just 3 years and 7 months old.

León has a degree in Business Management from Babson College (Wellesley, Mass.).

He married on 3 August 1958 to Petrica Cabral Vega (b. 1938), daughter of José María Cabral Bermúdez and Amelia Vega Batlle (sister of Julio Vega Batlle and great-granddaughter of Ulises Espaillat).

Business career 
In the 1960s, the tobacco company founded by his father, begins to grow tremendously.

References

External links 
  "José A. León Asensio". Fundación Eduardo León Jimenes. 
  "Historia".  Empresas León Jimenes, S. A.
  "Eduardo León Jimenes y María Asensio Córdoba: Formación de una Familia". Grupo León Jimenes.

Living people
1934 births
People from Santiago de los Caballeros
Dominican Republic people of Spanish descent
20th-century Dominican Republic businesspeople
Order of Merit of Duarte, Sánchez and Mella
Babson College alumni
Dominican Republic billionaires
White Dominicans